Michałowice  is a village in Pruszków County, Masovian Voivodeship, in east-central Poland. It is the seat of the gmina (administrative district) called Gmina Michałowice.

The village has a population of 2,699.

References

Villages in Pruszków County